Nogat  is a village in the administrative district of Gmina Gronowo Elbląskie, within Elbląg County, Warmian-Masurian Voivodeship, in northern Poland.

The village has a population of 160.

References

Nogat
1602 establishments in the Polish–Lithuanian Commonwealth
Populated places established in 1602